Ulvhild Håkansdotter (Swedish: Ulfhild, English: Wulfhild, Wolfhild), (c. 1095–c. 1148), was twice Queen of Sweden (c. 1117–25 and c. 1134–48) and once Queen of Denmark (c. 1130–34) through her successive marriages to Inge II of Sweden, Niels of Denmark, and Sverker I of Sweden. Ulvhild had an important role in the Nordic dynastic connections of her time, but the sources are insufficient on detailed circumstances. She is mentioned as a femme fatale of medieval Scandinavia, as well as a benefactor of the Catholic Church.

Early life
Ulvhild originated from Norway. The Norse saga manuscript Fagrskinna mentions her as the daughter of the Norwegian magnate Haakon Finnsson, of the Thjotta family. The name of her mother has not been preserved to later centuries. In modern times it has been suggested that her mother was the former Norwegian and Danish queen Margaret Fredkulla, daughter of Inge I of Sweden. However, this hypothesis cannot be substantiated.

Queenship

Ulvhild was firstly married to King Inge II of Sweden, in about 1116/17. They appear not to have had children. Inge was the junior of two reigning brothers. The elder brother, King Philip died in 1118 under unknown circumstances, leaving Inge as the sole ruler. The short chronicle in the Westrogothic law says that King Inge died of an evil drink in Östergötland. Some later sources place the assassination in Vreta Abbey. The year is not known, but it was no later than c. 1129. The writer Åke Ohlmarks has speculated that Ulvhild became acquainted with her future husband, the East Geatic magnate Sverker, and made him poison Inge.

Some time after the death of King Inge, Ulvhild moved to Denmark, rather than returning to Norway. Perhaps she did so to claim asylum: she seems to have had relatives and allies in Denmark, whereas political turbulence plagued Sweden. She married King Niels of Denmark after the death of his first queen, Margaret Fredkulla of Sweden, in c. 1130. The marriage more or less coincided with Niels's son Magnus the Strong being accepted as king in parts of Sweden. However, Ulvhild egged her stepson Magnus against his cousin and rival Canute Lavard. Canute was eventually murdered by Magnus in 1131. Civil war now broke out in Denmark, where Niels and Magnus stood against the claimant Eric Emun. Moreover, the marriage was not harmonious, and Niels was some 20–30 years older than his spouse. The chronicler Saxo Grammaticus informs us of the dramatic dissolution: 
"Meanwhile the Swedes, when they heard that Magnus was busy with war in Denmark, took a fellow countryman called Sverker, a man of low origins, as their king; not since they valued him that much, but since they would not stand under a foreigner. Since they were used to having one of their own at the head, they could not accept having a foreigner as chief. Niels had married Ulvhild from Norway after Margaret's death. Sverker sent errands to her and asked for her love. Shortly afterwards he clandestinely brought her from her husband and made her marry him. With this mistress whom he falsely called his wedded wife, he sired a son Charles who became king after him."

The event is not dated but must have taken place between 1132 and 1134. The curious elopement story may be explained by Ulvhild's position. Being the widow of Inge II, she represented the estates and influences of the extinct House of Stenkil. Marriage to Ulvhild legitimated the enthronement of the non-royal grandee Sverker, now when her stepson Magnus had been evicted from Sweden. As far as known, no objections (apart from the partial Saxo) were made against her third marriage or against the legitimacy of her children. On the contrary, Ulvhild is praised by clerical sources as a benefactor to the church. The Cistercians were called in on Ulvhild's initiative, and founded the abbeys of Alvastra and Nydala in 1143. Alvasta was even founded on ground which was part of Sverker's bridal gift to Ulvhild.

After at least a decade of queenship, Ulvhild died, some time between 1143 and 1150. Sverker married secondly with Rikissa of Poland, widow of Magnus, king of Gothenland, Sverker's earlier rival and opponent. This, too, was a politically motivated marriage which may have aimed to draw the last remains of Magnus's party to Sverker.

Children and family

Ulvhild was married three times; to King Inge II of Sweden in c. 1117, to King Niels of Denmark in c. 1130, and to King Sverker I of Sweden in c. 1134. She had at least two surviving sons and two surviving daughters, all born of her third marriage with Sverker:

 Helena, (fl. 1157), Queen consort of Denmark, in 1156 married to king Canute V of Denmark, Rikissa's son. Later nun in Vreta Abbey.
 Jon Sverkersson of Sweden, (d. c. 1152), mentioned as jarl, but killed by peasants during last years of his father Sverker.
 Charles VII of Sweden, (d. 1167), who after his father's murder held (parts of) Gothenland, was possibly called jarl and certainly considered his father's heir and dynastical successor, but ultimately succeeded to the throne of Sweden after their dynasty's rivals Eric IX and Magnus II, as King Charles VII of Sweden.
 Ingegerd Sverkersdotter (d. 1204), Abbess of Vreta Abbey

Some genealogies have Sune Sik (see him) as a younger son of King Sverker, being the father of Ingrid Ylva; it is not known if also was a son of Ulvhild.

References

Further reading
 Sven Tunberg, "Ulfhild", in Nordisk Familjebok, 2nd Edition,  
 
 Gunnar Hedin, Sveriges kungar och drottningar under 1000 år (The kings and Queens of Sweden during 1000 years) (In Swedish). Borås: Företagsgruppen, 2002.

Swedish queens
1090s births
1148 deaths
House of Stenkil
Danish royal consorts
Year of birth uncertain
12th-century Swedish people
12th-century Danish people
12th-century Swedish women
12th-century Danish women
Remarried royal consorts